These are the winners of the 2002 Billboard Music Awards, an awards show based on chart performance, and number of downloads and total airplay. All winners are in bold.

Winners and nominees

Artist of the year

Nelly
Ashanti
Eminem
Creed

Single of the year

How You Remind Me, Nickelback
Hot in Herre, Nelly
Foolish, Ashanti
Dilemma, Nelly and Kelly Rowland

Hot 100 Singles Group/Duo of the year

Nickelback
Puddle of Mudd
Creed
The Calling

Duo/Group of the year

Creed
Linkin Park
Puddle of Mudd
Nickelback

Rap Artist of the year

Nelly
Fat Joe
Ludacris
Ja Rule

Male Artist of the year

Nelly
Eminem
Ja Rule
Usher

Rock Artist of the year

Puddle of Mudd
Creed
Nickelback
Staind

Female Artist of the year

Ashanti
Avril Lavigne
Jennifer Lopez
P!nk

Rock Song of the year

Blurry, Puddle of Mudd
I Stand Alone, Godsmack
Wasting My Time, Default
For You, Staind

Dance Artist of the year

Cher
Kylie Minogue
Kim English
Enrique Iglesias
Michael Jackson

R&B Album of the year

The Eminem Show, Eminem
Ashanti, Ashanti
Nellyville, Nelly
Word of Mouf, Ludacris

Billboard 200 Album of the year

The Eminem Show, Eminem
Weathered, Creed
Nellyville, Nelly
M!ssundaztood, P!nk

Century Award

Annie Lennox

Female R&B/Hip-Hop Artist of the year

Ashanti
Faith Evans
Aaliyah
Mary J. Blige

Country Songs Artist of the year

Toby Keith
Garth Brooks
Alan Jackson
Tim McGraw

R&B/Hip-Hop Songs Artist of the year

Ashanti
Nelly
Usher
Aaliyah

Artist Achievement Award

Cher

200 Album Group of the year

Creed
Linkin Park
Dixie Chicks
Nickelback

Modern Rock Artist of the year

Puddle of Mudd
System of a Down
Incubus
Hoobastank

New R&B/Hip-Hop Artist of the year

Ashanti
Tweet
Clipse
B2K

Modern Rock Track of the year

Blurry, Puddle of Mudd
By the Way, Red Hot Chili Peppers,
The Middle, Jimmy Eat World
In the End, Linkin Park

New Pop Artist of the year

Ashanti
Vanessa Carlton
Avril Lavigne
The Calling

Hot 100 Singles Male Artist of the year

Usher
Ja Rule
Eminem
Nelly

Hot 100 Singles Artist of the year

Ashanti
Usher
Nickelback
Nelly

Top 40 Track of the year

How You Remind Me, Nickelback
Complicated, Avril Lavigne
Wherever You Will Go, The Calling
A Thousand Miles, Vanessa Carlton

R&B/Hip-Hop Male Artist of the year
 
Nelly
Ludacris
Nelly
Usher

Electronic Albums Artist of the year

Moby
Dirty Vegas
Louie DeVito
Paul Oakenfold

R&B Single of the year

Foolish, Ashanti
Halfcrazy, Musiq
Hot in Herre, Nelly
U Don't Have to Call, Usher

Catalog Artist of the year

Creed'

Rap Single of the year

Hot in Herre, Nelly
Dilemma, Nelly and Kelly Rowland
What's Luv?, Fat Joe feat. Ashanti
Always on Time, Ja Rule feat. Ashanti

Catalog Album of the year

 Human Clay

Electronic Album of the year

18, Moby
Dirty Vegas, Dirty Vegas
Blade II: The Soundtrack, Various Artists

Special Billboard Award

Michael Jackson

R&B Artist of the year

Ashanti
B2K
Tweet
Clipse

References

Billboard awards
2002 in American music
MGM Grand Garden Arena